Carew Park F.C. is a football club from Roxboro, Limerick City in Ireland. The club plays at Carew Park. They compete in the Limerick & District League.

The club colours are yellow shirts, blue shorts and blue socks.

The club competed in the FAI Cup in 2013, but did not make out of the first round.

References

Association football clubs in Limerick (city)
Association football clubs in County Limerick